The 1750s BC was a decade lasting from January 1, 1759 BC to December 31, 1750 BC.

Events and trends
 c. 1750 BC—The eruption of Mount Veniaminof, located on the Alaska Peninsula.
 c. 1750 BC—Hammurabi dies and is succeeded by his son, Samsu-iluna, who is already involved in Babylonian government.
c. 1750 BC: Indo-Aryan migration
1750 BC: Old Assyrian Empire disestablished

Significant people
 Hammurabi, king of Babylon since 1792 BC, according to the middle chronology
 Rim-Sin I, king of Larsa since 1758 BC, according to the short chronology

References

18th century BC